or  is a lake that lies in the municipality of Vevelstad in Nordland county, Norway. The lake is locally known as Væstanjaevrie. It lies within the periphery of the wild Lomsdal–Visten National Park.

The  lake lies in the southeastern part of the municipality.

See also
 List of lakes in Norway
 Geography of Norway

References

Lakes of Nordland
Vevelstad